Omar Quintero (born September 26, 1981 in Nogales, Mexico) is a Mexican professional basketball player. He is a 6'0" tall and 185 lb point guard who currently plays for Gigantes de Guayana in the Venezuelan League.  He also represented the senior Mexico national basketball team.

College career
Quintero attended one year of college (2002–03) in the United States, with NAIA school Southern Nazarene University, where he played with the Crimson Storm. Quintero averaged a school record and conference-leading 24.1 points per game for Southern Nazarene. He turned pro after one season at the school, playing for Fuerza Guinda de Nogales in Mexico.

Professional career
In addition to playing for local teams in Mexico, Quintero's pro career has also taken him to the Spanish League and Venezuelan League.  In the 2004–05 season, he played in the EuroLeague with Spanish side TAU Ceramica, scoring nine points in two games off the bench for the team. In 2008, he played in the BSN league of Puerto Rico, with Cariduros de Fajardo. In 2009, he played with Gigantes de Guayana of the Venezuelan League.

National team career
Quintero was long-time a member of the senior Mexico national basketball team.  He was the leading overall scorer at the 2003 FIBA AmeriCup, averaging 21.1 points per game, and the sixth overall scorer, with an average of 18.5 points per game, at the 2005 FIBA AmeriCup.

References

External links
FIBA Profile
Euroleague.net Profile
Eurobasket.com Profile
Spanish League Profile 

1981 births
Living people
Aguacateros de Michoacán players
Basketball players at the 2003 Pan American Games
Basketball players at the 2011 Pan American Games
Basketball players from Sonora
Correcaminos UAT Victoria players
Fuerza Guinda de Nogales players
Halcones de Ciudad Obregón players
Huracanes de Tampico players
Mexican expatriate basketball people in Spain
Mexican expatriate basketball people in the United States
Mexican expatriate basketball people in Venezuela
Mexican men's basketball players
Liga ACB players
Pan American Games medalists in basketball
Pan American Games silver medalists for Mexico
People from Nogales, Sonora
Point guards
Santos de San Luis players
Saski Baskonia players
Southern Nazarene Crimson Storm men's basketball players
Tijuana Zonkeys players
Medalists at the 2011 Pan American Games